Picacho  is an unincorporated community and census-designated place in Pinal County, Arizona, United States.  The population was 471 at the 2010 census.

Picacho has a post office with ZIP code 85241, which opened in 1881. The community's name is Spanish for "peak" and is derived from the Picacho Mountains. Picacho has a ZIP Code of 85241; in 2000, the population of the 85241 ZCTA was 521.

By late 2012, parts of Picacho were to be removed under Arizona eminent domain law on account of Interstate 10 expansion.

Demographics

In 2010 Picacho had a population of 471.  The racial and ethnic makeup of the population was 62.4% Hispanic or Latino, 33.8% non-Hispanic white, 0.6% non-Hispanic black, 0.7% Hispanic blacks, 1.5% non-Hispanic Native American, 1.0% Hispanic Native Americans, 0.6% non-Hispanics reporting some other race and 7.0% of the population reporting two or more races.

References

External links
 
 

Census-designated places in Pinal County, Arizona
San Antonio–San Diego Mail Line
Butterfield Overland Mail in New Mexico Territory
Stagecoach stops in the United States